Cheongju Sports Complex is a multi-use stadium in Cheongju, South Korea. It is currently used mostly for football matches and is the home of K League 2 club Chungbuk Cheongju FC. Opened in 1965, the stadium has a seating capacity for 16,280 spectators.

Football venues in South Korea
Sport in North Chungcheong Province
Buildings and structures in North Chungcheong Province
Cheongju
Sports venues completed in 1965
1965 establishments in South Korea
K League 2 stadiums
Multi-purpose stadiums in South Korea
20th-century architecture in South Korea